Isocitrate dehydrogenase (NAD+) (isocitric dehydrogenase, beta-ketoglutaric-isocitric carboxylase, isocitric acid dehydrogenase, NAD dependent isocitrate dehydrogenase, NAD isocitrate dehydrogenase, NAD-linked isocitrate dehydrogenase, NAD-specific isocitrate dehydrogenase, NAD isocitric dehydrogenase, isocitrate dehydrogenase (NAD), IDH (ambiguous), nicotinamide adenine dinucleotide isocitrate dehydrogenase) is an enzyme with systematic name isocitrate:NAD+ oxidoreductase (decarboxylating). This enzyme catalyses the following chemical reaction

 isocitrate + NAD+  2-oxoglutarate + CO2 + NADH

Requires Mn2+ or Mg2+ for activity. Unlike EC 1.1.1.42, isocitrate dehydrogenase (NADP+), oxalosuccinate cannot be used as a substrate. In eukaryotes, isocitrate dehydrogenase exists in two forms: an NAD+-linked enzyme found only in mitochondria and displaying allosteric properties, and a non-allosteric, NADP+-linked enzyme that is found in both mitochondria and cytoplasm. The enzyme from some species can also use NADP+ but much more slowly.

References

External links 
 

EC 1.1.1